Wendell Hobdy "Hob" Bryan II (born December 5, 1952) is an American politician. He is a member of the Mississippi State Senate from the 7th District, since 1984. He is a member of the Democratic Party. He is the son of Wendell Hobdy Bryan and Sarah Nadine (Morgan) Bryan.

References

1952 births
Living people
21st-century American politicians
People from Amory, Mississippi
Democratic Party Mississippi state senators